Jessia Islam (born 16 May 1997) is a Bangladeshi model and Miss Bangladesh 2017. She represented Bangladesh in the Miss World 2017 competition, where she placed in the top forty.

Early life and education

Islam was born in Dhaka, the capital city of Bangladesh, on 16 May 1997, and was raised in Gendaria Thana. She works as a professional model and is a student of South-Point School and College in Dhaka.

Pageantry

In 2017, Jessia Islam competed in the Miss Bangladesh 2017 competition. Originally, she was announced as the second runner-up, but after it was revealed that host Sheena Chohan read the results incorrectly, Islam was crowned first runner-up behind Jannatul Nayeem Avril. Immediately after the results were revealed, several judges of the competition came forward stating that they chose Islam as the winner, but Avril was crowned Miss Bangladesh 2017 instead for unknown reasons.

Five days after the competition, Avril was dethroned and Islam was crowned Miss Bangladesh 2017 in her place, after it was discovered that Avril had been previously married in 2013, before divorcing two months afterwards. Official rules state that no contestants may be currently or previously married. Islam went on to represent Bangladesh at the Miss World 2017 competition. At Miss World, Islam was declared the winner of group six of the Head-to-Head Challenge, which allowed her to place in the Top 40. She was also the runner-up for the People's Choice Award.

Notes

References

1997 births
Bangladeshi beauty pageant winners
Bangladeshi female models
Living people
Miss World 2017 delegates
People from Dhaka